The Torre Memorial is an annual chess tournament played in honour of the chess legend Carlos Torre Repetto (1905–1978). 
It is played in Mérida, Yucatán, Mexico. The first edition was played in 1987, and from a relatively weak tournament, it has now grown into a strong international tournament.

Winners
{| class="sortable wikitable"
! # !! Year !! Winner 
|-
| 1||1987||
|-
| 2||1989||
|-
| 3||1990||
|-
| 4||1991||
|-
| 5||1992||
|-
| 6||1993||
|-
| 7||1994||
|-
| 8||1995||
|-
| 9||1996||
|-
| 10||1997||
|-
| 11||1998||
|-
| 12||1999||
|-
| 13||2000||
|-
| 14||2001||
|-
| 15||2002||
|-
| 16||2003||
|-
| 17||2004||
|-
| 18||2005||
|-
| 19||2006||
|-
| 20||2007||
|-
| 21||2008||
|-
| 22||2010||
|-
| 23||2011||
|-
| 24||2012||
|-
| 25||2013||
|-
| 26||2014||
|-
| 27||2015||
|-
| 28||2016||
|-
|29
|2017
|
|-
|30
|2018
|
|-
|31
|2019
|
|}

References

Results from The Week in Chess: 1998, 1999, 2000, 2001, 2003,2004, 2005,2006, 2007
Results from ChessBase: 2005 edition
Results from the official homepage: Campeones 

Chess competitions
Chess in Mexico
Chess memorial tournaments